{{DISPLAYTITLE:C15H18N2O3}}
The molecular formula C15H18N2O3 (molar mass: 274.314 g/mol) may refer to:

 Benzylbutylbarbiturate
 Terbequinil

Molecular formulas